Yurovo is a rural locality (a village) in Kupriyanovskoye Rural Settlement, Gorokhovetsky District, Vladimir Oblast, Russia. The population was 206 as of 2010. There are 6 streets.

Geography 
Yurovo is located on the Suvoroshch River, 12 km southeast of Gorokhovets (the district's administrative centre) by road. Semyonovka is the nearest rural locality.

References 

Rural localities in Gorokhovetsky District